Islesboro is a town in Waldo County, Maine, United States, comprising Islesboro Island and several smaller islands. The population was 583 at the 2020 census. It has a summer colony accessible by state ferry service from Lincolnville Beach three miles to the west, by private boat, or by air taxi service. Home to Warren Island State Park, Islesboro includes the village of Dark Harbor.

History

The Penobscot people called it Pitaubegwimenahanuk, meaning "the island that lies between two channels", although André Thevet recorded the name Aiayascon in 1556.  It was part of the Waldo Patent. First called Long Island Plantation, it was settled in 1769. It was incorporated as Islesborough on January 28, 1789, although over time the spelling was contracted to Islesboro.

With many harbors and coves, the island was home to the largest commercial shipping fleet in the bay during the 19th century. Following the Civil War, however, Islesboro developed as a resort community, and many large and luxurious summer homes were built. Their large yachts cruised and raced throughout the Gulf of Maine. The town remains an upper-class enclave and summer colony.

Geography

Islands and villages

Situated in upper Penobscot Bay, the island town separates East from West Penobscot Bay. Islesboro Island is narrow, mainly north-south and 14 miles long. Smaller islands include Job Island, Seven Hundred Acre Island, Spruce Island, Warren Island, Seal Island, Ram Island, Thrumcap, Middle Island, Minot Island, Ensign Island (#1 and #2), Lime Island, Flat Island, Hutchins Island, Little Island, Little Bermuda(?), Joe's Rock, and Birch Point. Semi-submerged features include Haskell Ledge, Minor Ledge, and Minot Island Ledge.

The main island consists of two wider landmasses separated by a narrow isthmus called The Narrows. Neighborhoods and villages (small clusters of buildings) are distributed across the two:
 Up Island, the northern landmass
 Pripet, also known as Warren's Landing or Beckett's Landing – the historic site of a kiln and steamboat wharf
 North Islesboro – historic village and current site of a general store
 Ryder's Cove – historic summer vacation spot and steamboat destination
 Down Island, the southern landmass
 Islesboro Village, also known as Guinea Village – near Islesboro Harbor
 Hewes Point – historic summer vacation spot and steamboat destination
 Town Center – town offices, community center, and post office
 Grindle Point – current ferry landing, with historic lighthouse
 Dark Harbor – historic summer vacation spot and steamboat destination

Size and features

There is one large pond, called Meadow Pond, in the northern portion of the Island, the work of beavers that have dammed a narrow place. Ice was once harvested from this pond for export to places as far away as India.  Hewes Point was named for Paola Hewes, an early pioneer settler.

Climate
This climatic region is typified by large seasonal temperature differences, with warm to hot (and often humid) summers and cold (sometimes severely cold) winters. According to the Köppen Climate Classification system, Islesboro has a humid continental climate, abbreviated "Dfb" on climate maps.

Demographics

2010 census
As of the census of 2010, there were 566 people, 270 households, and 161 families living in the town. The racial makeup of the town was 97.9% White, 0.7% African American, 0.2% Native American, 0.2% Asian, 0.5% from other races, and 0.5% from two or more races. Hispanic or Latino of any race were 0.9% of the population.

There were 270 households, of which 20.7% had children under the age of 18 living with them, 46.7% were married couples living together, 7.0% had a female householder with no husband present, 5.9% had a male householder with no wife present, and 40.4% were non-families. Of all households 34.4% were made up of individuals, and 15.2% had someone living alone who was 65 years of age or older. The average household size was 2.07 and the average family size was 2.57.

The median age in the town was 52.1 years. 17.3% of residents were under the age of 18; 3.4% were between the ages of 18 and 24; 17.4% were from 25 to 44; 37.5% were from 45 to 64; and 24.4% were 65 years of age or older. The gender makeup of the town was 48.2% male and 51.8% female.

2000 census
As of the census of 2000, there were 603 people, 280 households, and 176 families living in the town. The racial makeup of the town was 98.18% White, 0.17% African American, 0.17% Native American, 0.17% Asian, 0.50% from other races, and 0.83% from two or more races. Hispanic or Latino of any race were 1.33% of the population.

There were 280 households, out of which 25.0% had children under the age of 18 living with them, 53.2% were married couples living together, 5.7% had a female householder with no husband present, and 36.8% were non-families. Of all households 30.7% were made up of individuals, and 13.6% had someone living alone who was 65 years of age or older.  The average household size was 2.15 and the average family size was 2.69.

In the town, the population was spread out, with 20.2% under the age of 18, 3.3% from 18 to 24, 25.4% from 25 to 44, 31.2% from 45 to 64, and 19.9% who were 65 years of age or older.  The median age was 46 years. For every 100 females, there were 97.1 males.  For every 100 females age 18 and over, there were 97.1 males.

The median income for a household in the town was $39,643, and the median income for a family was $48,750. Males had a median income of $35,000 versus $24,750 for females. The per capita income for the town was $25,653.  About 5.5% of families and 7.2% of the population were below the poverty line, including 8.3% of those under age 18 and 9.7% of those age 65 or over.

Education

Islesboro Central School is one of four island schools in Maine that cover all grades (K–12), the others being North Haven, Vinalhaven, and Mount Desert Island. It is also unique that it allows mainland students to pay tuition to attend from grades 5 through 12. The "magnet" students, and some teachers, who live on the mainland take the ferry across every morning where they are met with a school bus to take them to school. Students come from a range of midcoast towns to attend ICS. The number of the students in the school fluctuates, but is around 100 students in kindergarten through 12th grade.

The school is a member of the Busline League for middle school sports, and is in Class D, South, in the Maine Principals' Association. The competitive sports offered through the school include cross country running, sailing, soccer, basketball, and Ultimate Frisbee.

Notable people 

 Winthrop Aldrich, banker and US Ambassador to Great Britain 
 Kirstie Alley, actress
 John Judson Ames, editor and proprietor of the first newspaper in San Diego, California
 Honor Blackman, actress
 C. Douglas Dillon, diplomat and politician
 Joan Dillon, American born duchess and princess
 Ruth Draper, dramatist
 Charles Dana Gibson, illustrator
 Isabel Gillies, actress and author
 Ved Mehta, author
 Sister Parish, interior decorator
 Kelly Preston, actress
 George Stevens Jr., film director
 John Train, investment advisor and author
 John Travolta, actor
 Lily Tuck, writer

See also
 Up-island spider
 List of islands of Maine

References

External links
  Official Web Page
 About Islesboro
 The Alice L. Pendleton Library
 Islesboro Community Center
 Islesboro Island Trust
 Islesboro Comprehensive Plan
 Islesboro Central School District
 Maine Genealogy: Islesboro, Waldo County, Maine
 Islesboro Maine overview 

Islands of Maine
Islands of Waldo County, Maine
Populated coastal places in Maine
Towns in Waldo County, Maine
Coastal islands of Maine